James Sallis (born December 21, 1944) is an American crime writer who wrote a series of novels featuring the detective character Lew Griffin set in New Orleans, and the 2005 novel Drive, which was adapted into  a 2011 film of the same name.

Sallis began writing science fiction for magazines in the late 1960s. Having sold several stories to Damon Knight for his Orbit series of anthologies, and a story to Michael Moorcock by the time he was in his mid-twenties, Sallis was then invited to go to London to help edit New Worlds just as it changed to its large format during its Michael Moorcock-directed New Wave SF phase; Sallis published his first sf story, "Kazoo" there in 1967 and was co-editor from April 1968 through Feb 1969. His clearly acknowledged models in the French avant-garde and the gnomic brevity of much of his work limited his appeal in the science fiction world, though he received some critical acclaim for A Few Last Words (collection, 1970). Sallis has been influenced by French New Novelists including Michel Butor and Robbe-Grillet. Camus’ L'Etranger is  mentioned in each of Sallis's novels.

Later short work (uncollected until Time's Hammers) appeared in the USA through the 1970s and 1980s.

He is the brother of philosopher John Sallis.

Career and critical reception
Sallis has worked as a creative writing teacher, respiratory therapist, musician, music teacher, screenwriter, periodical editor, book reviewer, and translator, winning acclaim for his 1993 version of Raymond Queneau's Saint Glinglin. Trained as a respiratory therapist, Sallis worked in intensive care for both adults and newborns at many hospitals. 

In 2000 he appeared as himself in the UK Channel 4 project Asylum (2000)—a mix of both documentary and fiction, where in the future a group of people are looking back at the twentieth century after a virus has wiped out most of the culture—written and directed by Christopher Petit and Iain Sinclair. Sallis appeas alongside Michael Moorcock and Ed Dorn. In 2012 he played a small part as a detective in the film The Detective's Lover directed by Travis Mills. He taught writing classes at Otis College in Los Angeles and until September 2015 at Phoenix College in Arizona; he left his job rather than sign a state-mandated loyalty oath that he regards as unconstitutional.

In Lit Hub Lisa Levy considered his output significant and diverse and ranked him as perhaps alongside Don DeLillo (b.1936) and Thomas Pynchon (b. 1937).

On noir Sallis argues it is an oppositional form, working not to reinforce American culture but to subvert it, “there is no moral order save which a man creates from himself. Like high art, these stories worked hard  to unfold the lies society tells us and the lies we tell ourselves".

Awards 
 Grand Prix de Littérature policière for 2012's The Killer is Dying
Bouchercon lifetime achievement award 
Hammett Award for literary excellence in crime writing

Bibliography

Novels
Lew Griffin series

Lew Griffin is an African-American amateur detective,  functioning alcoholic, sometime teacher and novelist. In The Long-Legged Fly the narrative opens with Griffin committing a murder only obliquely referred to again, creating a pervasive sense of guilt which dogs Griffin throughout the subsequent three decades through several missing-persons cases and his own back story.

 
 Reprint: No Exit Press, 1996
 
 Reprints: No Exit Press, 1996; Walker & Co., 2003
 
 Reprints: No Exit Press, 1997; Walker & Co, 2003
 Eye of the Cricket (New York: Walker & Co, 1997 & 2000. Harpenden: No Exit Press, 1998)
 Bluebottle (New York: Walker & Co, 1999. Harpenden: No Exit Press, 1999)
 The Long-Legged Fly/Moth Omnibus Edition (Harpenden: No Exit Press, 2000)
 Ghost of a Flea (New York: Walker & Co, 2001 & 2000. Harpenden: No Exit Press, 2001)

John Turner series
 Cypress Grove (New York: Walker & Co, 2003. Harpenden: No Exit Press, 2003)
 Cripple Creek (New York: Walker & Co, 2006)
 Salt River (New York: Walker & Co, 2007)

The Driver series
 Drive (Scottsdale, AZ: Poisoned Pen Press, 2005):  Set mostly in Arizona and L.A., Drive is about a man who does stunt driving for movies by day and drives for criminals at night. A film version was made in 2011 by director Nicolas Winding Refn, starring Ryan Gosling; Refn won the Best Director award at the 2011 Cannes Film Festival.
 Driven (2012): Seven years after the events of Drive, Driver is now living in Phoenix under the name Paul West, and is engaged to be married. When two goons attack him and his fiancée, leaving her dead, Driver seeks vengeance.

Other novels
 Renderings (Seattle, Washington: Black Heron Press, 1995)
 Death Will Have Your Eyes (New York: St Martins Press, 1997. Harpenden: No Exit Press, 1997)
 The Killer Is Dying (New York: Walker & Co, 2011)
 Others of My Kind (New York: Bloomsbury USA, 2013)
 Willnot (New York: Bloomsbury USA, 2016)
 Sarah Jane (New York: Soho Press, 2019)

Short fiction 
Collections
 A Few Last Words (New York: Macmillan, 1970).
 Limits of the Sensible World (Austin, Texas: Host Publications, 1994).
 Time's Hammers: Collected Stories (Edgbaston, Birmingham: Toxic, 2000).
 A City Equal to My Desire (Point Blank Press, 2004).
 The James Sallis Reader (Rockville, MD: Wildside Press, 2005).
 Potato Tree (Host Publications, Inc., 2007).

Stories

Anthologies
 The War Book (London: Rupert Hart-Davis, 1969/Panther, 1971) - includes his short story "And then the dark..."
 The Shores Beneath (New York: Avon Books, 1973).

Poetry 
Collections
 Sorrow's Kitchen (East Lansing: Michigan State University Press, 2000).
 Rain's Eagerness (Hemet, CA: The Aldrich Press, 2013).
 Black Night's Gonna Catch Me Here: New & Selected Poems (Moorhead, MN: New Rivers Press, 2015).

Criticism, essays, and biographies
 Difficult Lives: Jim Thompson – David Goodis – Chester Himes (New York: Gryphon Books, 1993; rev. ed., 2000).
 Ash of Stars: On the Writings of Samuel R. Delany (Jackson, Mississippi: University Press of Mississippi, 1996), edited by James Sallis.
 Gently into the Land of the Meateaters (Seattle, Washington: Black Heron Press, 2000).
 Chester Himes: A Life (Edinburgh: Payback Press, 2000. New York: Walker & Co, 2001).

Book reviews

Musicology
 The Guitar Players: One Instrument and Its Masters in American Music (New York: William Morrow, 1982; Lincoln, Nebraska, and London: Bison Books/University of Nebraska Press, 1994, rev. ed.).
 Jazz Guitars: An Anthology (New York: William Morrow, 1984), edited by James Sallis.
 The Guitar in Jazz (Lincoln, Nebraska: University of Nebraska Press, 1996), edited by James Sallis.

Translation work
 Saint Glinglin (Dalkey Archive Press, 1993; trade paperback 2000) by Raymond Queneau.
 My Tongue in Other Cheeks (Obscure Publications, 2003) — selected translations of poems from French, Spanish and Russian.

Adaptations
Radio
Eye of the Cricket was adapted for BBC Radio 7 as part of the Readings to Die For series. It aired in 2007, 2008 and 2010. The main voice artist was Ray Shell.
Film
In 2011, Sallis' novel Drive was adapted by director Nicolas Winding Refn into a film of the same name starring Ryan Gosling and Carey Mulligan.

References

Select James Sallis Bibliography

The James Sallis Webpages

1944 births
Living people
American crime writers
Asimov's Science Fiction people
The Magazine of Fantasy & Science Fiction people
People from Helena, Arkansas
Writers from Arkansas
American male novelists